Cachapoal Province is one of three provinces of the central Chilean region of O'Higgins (VI). Its capital is the city of Rancagua (pop. 214,344).

Geography and demography
It is the fifth most populated province in the country. Between the 1992 and 2002 censuses, the population grew by 13.8% (65,871 persons).

Administration
As a province, Cachapoal is a second-level administrative division of Chile. It is governed by the regional delegate of O'Higgins, who is appointed by the president.

Communes
The province comprises seventeen communes, each governed by a municipality consisting of an elected alcalde and municipal council.

Codegua
Coínco
Coltauco
Doñihue
Graneros
Las Cabras
Machalí
Malloa
Olivar
Peumo
Pichidegua
Quinta de Tilcoco
Rancagua
Requínoa
Rengo
Mostazal
San Vicente de Tagua Tagua

Cachapoal Valley wine region

Located 85 km (53 mi) south of Santiago, the Cachapoal Valley is a wine-growing area in Cachapoal in the O`Higgins Region of central Chile, to the north of the Rapel Valley. It is located between the heights of Paine to the north and Pelequén to the south and between the Andes to the west and the smaller coastal range to the east. The valley takes its name from the Cachapoal River that flows through Rapel Valley along with its tributaries, the Claro and Cortaderal Rivers. All these watercourses flow into Lake Rapel.
 
The climate of the valley is temperate and consistently Mediterranean, sheltered by the coastal range from the cooling influences of the Pacific Ocean.
 
Most of Cachapoal's noteworthy wineries and vineyards are located toward the east of the region, in the foothills of the Andes, away from the warmer valley floor. This is an area for Cabernet Sauvignon vines, whereas closer to the coast the ocean breezes flow through the coastal range, and there are more Carménère vines.

References

External links
  Gobernación de Cachapoal
 

Cachapoal
Provinces of O'Higgins Region